A dandelion chip is an electronic device, installed on the bayonet mount of a non-electronic camera lens or adapter, which enables electronic interoperation with certain cameras. The device consists of an integrated circuit connected to a series of exposed electrical contacts, in a curved package which matches the lens mount. It is designed to be affixed in a particular position on the mount, in order to mate with matching contacts on the camera body. The contacts on both sides of the mount are commonly known as CPU contacts.

Camera functions enabled by the chip may include exposure metering, aperture display and control, focus confirmation and fine-tuning, and Exif metadata recording.

The level of additional functionality enabled by the chip depends on the camera. Some cameras provide certain electronic functions even with a non-electronic lens. For example, professional-level Nikon DSLRs provide metering and focus confirmation, and store lens data programmed into the camera, regardless of whether the mounted lens has electronic contacts. By contrast, many consumer-level Nikon DSLRs require an electronically enabled lens to perform functions as basic as metering.

External links
Filmprocess: Dandelion

Digital photography